The 12341 / 12342 Agnibina Express is a train belonging to Eastern Railway in West Bengal.

Route & halts

 
 
 Mankar
 Panagarh

Schedule
 Runs daily

12341

12342 

 Runs daily

Coach composition

The train currently runs with LHB rakes, since 2018. The train consists of 19 coaches:

 2 air conditioned chair cars
 3 second sitting chair cars
 11 general
 2 EOG cum luggage break van.

Traction
It is hauled by a Howrah-based WAP-7 locomotive on its entire journey.

Rake sharing

It shares it rake with the Shantiniketan Express and the Coalfield Express.

Notes 
It was started as Chittaranjan–Howrah Bidhan Express but later was short terminated at Asansol for operational reasons during the 1970s.

This train runs 7 days a week in both the directions. It is the best train between Howrah and Asansol after Black Diamond Express.

See also 

 Howrah Junction railway station
 Asansol Junction railway station
 Shantiniketan Express
 Coalfield Express

External links 

 12341/Agnibina (Bidhan) Express India Rail Info
 12342/Agnibina (Bidhan) Express India Rail Info

Notes

References 

Rail transport in Howrah
Transport in Asansol
Named passenger trains of India
Rail transport in West Bengal
Express trains in India